The 2001 FIA GT Brno 500 km was the second round the 2001 FIA GT Championship season.  It took place at the Masaryk Circuit, Czech Republic, on April 16, 2001.

Official results
Class winners in bold.  Cars failing to complete 70% of winner's distance marked as Not Classified (NC).

Statistics
 Pole position – #11 Paul Belmondo Racing – 2:02.739
 Fastest lap – #1 Lister Storm Racing – 2:02.037
 Average speed – 138.444 km/h

References

 
 
 

B
Brno 500 km